Miranda was launched in Bristol in 1828. In 1829–1830 she made one voyage to Bengal, sailing under a licence from the British East India Company (EIC). On her return she became a West Indiaman, sailing to Jamaica and Antigua. She was broken up around 1851.

Career
Miranda transferred her registry to London on 3 June 1830. She first appeared in Lloyd's Registry (LR) in 1829.

In 1813 the EIC had lost its monopoly on the trade between India and Britain. British ships were then free to sail to India or the Indian Ocean under a licence from the EIC.

On 29 February 1829 Miranda, J.Dalgarno, master, sailed from London for Mauritius and Ceylon under a license from the EIC. Ship arrival and departure data show Miranda leaving London on 4 March, and Mauritius on 13 July, and arriving at Calcutta on 16 August. On 19 September she sailed for London via Mauritius. She arrived at Mauritius on 1 December.

On 19 February 1828 Miranda, Sowell, master, was among the vessels that put into the Isles of Scilly after having been caught in a gale a few days earlier. Mirandas pumps were chocked and her ballast had shifted. She was on a voyage from London to Antigua.

On 26 May Miranda, Sowell, master, was run into by a large vessel during a fog and sustained some damage. She arrived at the Start from Antigua on 16 June. 

On 23 December 1846 Miranda, Leonard, master, came into Southampton Docks in a distressed state. She had been sailing from Antigua to London with 500 hogsheads of sugar and molasses. Captain Leonard decided to discharge the cargo rather than risk the passage to London.

Fate
The entry for Miranda in the 1851 issue of LR carried the annotation "broken up".

Citations and references
Citations

References
 
 

1829 ships
Ships built in Bristol
Age of Sail merchant ships of England